Callomphala globosa is a species of small sea snail, a marine gastropod mollusk in the family Skeneidae.

Description
(Original description by Charles Hedley) The height of this shell is 2 mm, its diameter 2.4 mm. This species differs from Callomphala lucida by being smaller, higher in proportion and closely engraved by numerous fine, spiral striae.

Distribution
This marine species occurs off Queensland, Australia.

References

globosa
Gastropods described in 1901